This is a list of Chinese writers.

Chronological list

Qin dynasty and before 
 Gan De (fl. 4th century BC)
 Gongsun Long (c. 325–250 BC)
 Kong Qiu (551–479 BC)
 Li Kui (fl. 4th century BC)
 Lu Jia (d. 170 BC)
 Han Fei (280–233 BC)
 Mengzi (372–289 BC)
 Mozi (c. 470–391 BC)
 Qu Yuan (343–278 BC)
 Shang Yang (390–338 BC)
 Shen Dao (c. 395–315 BC)
 Shen Buhai (d. 337 BC)
 Shi Shen (fl. 4th century BC)
 Song Yu (fl. 3rd century BC)
 Sunzi (544–496 BC)
 Sun Bin (d. 316 BC)
 Wu Qi (440–381 BC)
 Xunzi (c. 310–238 BC)
 Zisi (c. 481–402 BC)
 Zengzi (505–436 BC)
 Zhuangzi (369–286 BC)

Han dynasty and following 

 Ban Biao (3–54)
 Ban Gu (32–92)
 Ban Zhao (fl. 1st century)
 Cao Cao (155–220) 
 Cao Pi (187–226) 
 Cao Zhi (192–232)
 Cai Yan (fl. 2nd century)
 Cai Yong (132–192)
 Chen Shou (233–297)
 Dong Zhongshu (179–104 BC)
 Fan Ye (398–445)
 Ge Hong (284–364)
 Guo Pu (276–324)
 Jing Fang (78–37 BC)
 Li Delin (531–591)
 Lu Ji (261–303) 
 Liu Hui (fl. 3rd century)
 Liu Xie (fl. 5th century)
 Liu Xin (d. 23)
 Liu Xiang (77–6 BC)
 Ma Rong (79–166)
 Ruan Ji (210-263)
 Shen Yue (441–513)
 Sima Qian (c. 145–90 BC)
 Sima Xiangru (179–117 BC)
 Su Hui (fl. 4th century)
 Su Xiaoxiao (fl. 4th century)
 Sunzi (fl. 3rd century)
 Tao Yuanming (365–427)
 Wang Bi (226–249)
 Wang Chong (27–97)
 Wang Xizhi (303–361)
 Wang Xianzhi (344–386)
 Wei Shou (506–572)
 Wei Shuo (272–349)
 Wei Boyang (fl. 2nd century)
 Wei Huacun (252–334)
 Xi Kang (223–262) 
 Xie Daoyun (fl. 4th century)
 Xie Lingyun (385–433)
 Xie He (fl. 5th century)
 Yan Zhitui (531–591)
 Yu Huan (fl. 3rd century)
 Yang Xiong (53 BC–18)
 Zu Chongzhi (429–500)
 Zu Geng (fl. 5th century)
 Zhong Yao (151–230)
 Zhong Hui (225–264)
 Zheng Xuan (127–200)
 Zhang Zhi (fl. 2nd century)
 Zhang Heng (78–139)

Tang dynasty and following 

 Bai Juyi (772–846)
 Bianji (fl. 7th century)
 Chu Suiliang (597–658)
 Chen Zi'ang (661–702)
 Cui Hao (704–754)
 Du Fu (712–770) 
 Du Huan (fl. 8th century)
 Du Mu (803–852) 
 Du You (735–812)
 Duan Chengshi (d. 863)
 Fang Xuanling (579–648)
 Fenggan (fl. 8th century)
 He Zhizhang (659–744)
 Han Yu (768–824)
 Hanshan (fl. 9th century)
 Huaisu (737–799)
 Jia Dao (779–843)
 Mo Xuanqing (d. 834)
 Meng Haoran (691–740)
 Li Ao (772–841)
 Li He (791–817) 
 Li Yu (937–978)
 Li Bai (701–762) 
 Li Qiao (644–713)
 Li Jing (571–649)
 Li Baiyao (564–647)
 Li Dashi (570–628)
 Li Shangyin (812–858)
 Li Shizhi (d. 747)
 Li Chunfeng (602–670)
 Liu Zhiji (661–721)
 Liu Zhi (fl. 8th century)
 Liu Yuxi (772–842)
 Liu Zongyuan (773–819)
 Liu Gongquan (778–865)
 Lu Guimeng (d. 881)
 Lu Tong (790–835)
 Luo Yin (833–909)
 Luo Binwang (c. 640–684)
 Ouyang Xun (557–641)
 Pi Rixiu (c. 834–883)
 Shide (fl. 9th century) 
 Sun Simiao (581–682)
 Sun Guoting (646–691)
 Sima Zhen (fl. 8th century)
 Wang Bo (c. 649–676)
 Wang Wei (701–761)
 Wang Changling (698–765) 
 Wang Fanzhi (fl. 7th century)
 Wei Zheng (580–643)
 Wei Zhuang (836–910)
 Xue Juzheng (912–981)
 Xue Tao (768–831)
 Yu Xuanji (844–869)
 Yu Shinan (558–638)
 Yi Xing (683–727)
 Yan Shigu (581–645)
 Yan Zhenqing (709–785)
 Yuan Zhen (779–831)
 Zhang Ji (fl. 8th century)
 Zhang Yanyuan (fl. 9th century)
 Zhang Yaotiao (fl. 9th century)
 Zhang Xu (fl. 8th century)

Song dynasty and following 

 Bai Renfu (1226–1306)
 Cai Xiang (1012–1067)
 Cheng Yi (1033–1107)
 Fan Chengda (1126–1193)
 Guan Hanqing (fl. 13th century)
 Guo Shoujing (1231–1316)
 Hu Sanxing (1230–1302)
 Huang Tingjian (1045–1105)
 Li Fang (925–996)
 Li Qingzhao (c. 1084 – 1151)
 Liu Bowen (1311–1375)
 Liu Yong (fl. 11th century) 
 Luo Guanzhong (fl. 14th century)
 Lu You (1125–1210)
 Lu Zhi (c. 1243 – 1315)
 Ma Zhiyuan (c. 1270 – 1330)
 Ma Duanlin (1245–1322)
 Mi Fu (1051–1107)
 Ouyang Xiu (1007–1072) 
 Qiao Ji (died 1345)
 Qu You (1341–1427)
 Qin Jiushao (c. 1202 – 1261)
 Su Shi (1037–1101)
 Su Song (1020–1101)
 Shi Naian (c. 1296 – 1372)
 Shao Yong (1011–1077)
 Shen Kuo (1031–1095)
 Sima Guang (1019–1086)
 Wen Tianxiang (1236–1282) 
 Wang Shifu (fl. 14th century)
 Wang Anshi (1021–1086)
 Wang Chongyang (1113–1170)
 Wuzhun Shifan (1178–1249)
 Xu Zaisi (fl. 14th century)
 Xin Qiji (1140–1207)
 Ye Shi (1150–1223)
 Yu Hao (fl. 10th century)
 Yang Hui (c. 1238 – 1298)
 Zhao Luanluan (fl. 13th century)
 Zhao Mengfu (1254–1322)
 Zhu Yu (fl. 12th century)
 Zhou Dunyi (1017–1073)
 Zeng Gong (1019–1083)
 Zhu Shijie (fl. 13th century)
 Zhu Xi (1130–1200)
 Zhang Sixun (fl. 10th century)
 Zhang Zai (1020–1077)

Ming dynasty 

 Dong Qichang (1555–1636)
 Feng Menglong (1574–1645) 
 Gao Lian (fl. 16th century)
 Hong Zicheng (1593–1665)
 Huang Ruheng (1558–1626)
 Jin Shengtan (1608–1661)
 Jiao Yu (fl. 14th century)
 Li Zhi (1527–1602)
 Li Shizhen (1518–1593)
 Liu Tong (c. 1593 – 1636)
 Ling Mengchu (1580–1644)
 Shi Kefa (1601–1645)
 Shen Zhou (1427–1509)
 Song Yingxing (1587–1666)
 Tang Xianzu (1550–1616) 
 Wu Cheng'en (c. 1500 – 1582)
 Wen Zhengming (1470–1559)
 Wen Zhenheng (1585–1645)
 Wang Fuzhi (1619–1692)
 Wang Yangming (1472–1529)
 Wang Zhen (fl. 14th century)
 Xu Wei (1521–1593)
 Xu Guangqi (1562–1633)
 Xu Xiake (1587–1641)
 Xu Yihua (1362–1407)
 Yuan Hongdao (1568–1610)
 Zhan Ruoshui (1466–1560)
 Zhang Tingyu (1672–1755)

Qing dynasty 

 Bada Shanren (c. 1626 – 1705)
 Chen Hongmou (1696–1771)
 Cao Xueqin (c. 1715 – 1764)
 Dai Xi (1801–1860)
 Dai Zhen (1724–1777)
 Fu Shanxiang (1830–1864)
 He Changling (1785–1848)
 Hong Liangji (1746–1809)
 Huang Zongxi (1610–1695)
 Huang Zunxian (1848–1905)
 Jiang Tingxi (1669–1732)
 Kang Youwei (1858–1927)
 Li Yu (1610–1680)
 Li Shanlan (1810–1882)
 Lu Haodong (1868–1895)
 Lin Shu (1852–1924)
 Liu E (1857–1909)
 Liang Qichao (1873–1929)
 Pu Songling (1640–1715)
 Sha Menghai (1900–1992)
 Tan Sitong (1865–1898)
 Tang Zhen (1630–1704)
 Wu Jiaji (1618–1684)
 Wu Jingzi (1701–1754)
 Wei Yuan (1794–1856)
 Wang Zhen (1867–1938)
 Wang Guowei (1877–1927) 
 Yan Fu (1853–1921)
 Yun Zhu (1771–1833)
 Yang Borun (1837–1911)
 Yu Zhengxie (1775–1840)
 Yuan Mei (1716–1797)
 Zhou Lianggong (1612–1672)
 Zhang Binglin (1868–1936)

Modern period 
 Amy Tan (born 1952)
 Anthony
 Bai Shouyi (1909–2000)
 Ba Jin (1904-2005)
 Bei Dao (born 1949)
 Cai Chongda (born 1982)
 Cao Yu (1910–1996)
 Chen Dayu (1912–2001)
 Chen Maiping (born 1952)
 Chen Ran (born 1962)
 Chen Xuezhao (1906–1991)
 Chu Anping (1909–1966)
 C. C. Li (1911–2003)
 Ding Ling (1904–1986)
 Dai Wangshu (1905–1950)
 Eileen Chang (1920–1995)
 Eric Liu (born 1968)
 Fan Chung (born 1949)
 Feng Jicai (born 1942)
 Feng Yidai (1913–2005)
 Feng Youlan (1895–1990)
 Gang Tian (born 1958)
 Gao Xingjian (born 1940) 
 Gu Jiegang (1893–1980)
 Guo Moruo (1892–1978)
 Han Shaogong (born 1953)
 Hao Jingfang
 Ho Fuk Yan
 Hong Ying (born 1962)
 Ganggang Hu Guidice (born 1984)
 Hu Shih (1891–1962)
 Huang Yuanyong (1885–1915)
 Iris Chang (1968–2004) – Chinese-American author of The Rape of Nanking
 Jao Tsung-I (1917–2018)
 Jia Rongqing
 Jiang Fangzhou
 Jin Yong (1924–2018)
 Jin Yuelin (1895–1984)
 Jung Chang (born 1952) – author of Wild Swans
 Ke Yan (1929–2011)
 Ke Zhao (1910–2002)
 Lao She (1899–1966) 
 Leung Long Chau (1911–1998)
 Li Ao (1935–2018)
 Liu Binyan (1925–2005)
 Li Shicen (1892–1934)
 Li Yaotang (1904–2005)
 Lin Haiyin (1918–2001)
 Lin Huiyin (1904–1955) 
 Lin Yutang (1895–1976)
 Liang Shuming (1893–1988)
 Lu Xun (1881–1936)
 Mao Dun (1896–1981)
 Timothy Mo (born 1950)
 Ma Jian (born 1953)
 Mian Mian (born 1970)
 Mo Yan (born 1955)
 Mou Zongsan (1909–1995)
 Mu Shiying (1912–1940)
 Murong Xuecun (born 1974)
 Öser (born 1966)
 Pai Hsien-yung (born 1937)
 Qian Xuantong (1887–1939)
 Qian Zhongshu (1910–1998)
 Qin Hui (born 1953)
 Qu Bo (1923–2002)
 Ru Zhijuan (1925–1998)
 Su Manshu (1884–1918)
 Su Qing (1914–1982) author of 10 Years of Marriage
 Su Tong (born 1963)
 Sun Guangyuan (1900–1979)
 Shen Congwen (1902–1988)
 Shen Rong (b. 1936)
 Shi Zhecun (1905–2003)
 Shing-Tung Yau (born 1949)
 Tang Junyi (1909–1978)
 Tian Han (1898–1968)
 Tie Ning (born 1957)
 Wang Hao (1921–1995)
 Wang Lixiong (born 1953)
 Wang Ruowang (1918–2001)
 Wang Ruoshui (1926–2002)
 Wang Shuo (born 1958)
 Wen Yiduo (1899–1946)
 Woo Tsin-hang (1865–1953)
 Xie Bingying (1906–2000)
 Xiao Hong (1911–1942)
 Xiong Shili (1885–1968)
 Xiong Qinglai (1893–1969)
 Xu Dishan (1893–1941)
 Xu Youyu (born 1947) 
 Xu Zhimo (1897–1931) 
 Xue Zongzheng (born 1935)
 Yan Huiqing (1877–1950)
 Yang Jianli (born 1963)
 Yan Lianke (born 1958)
 Yang Rongguo (1907–1978)
 Yang Shuo (1913–1968)
 Ye Shengtao (1894–1988)
 Yu Dafu (1896–1945)
 Yu Hua (born 1960)
 Yuan Hongbing (born 1953)
 Yum-Tong Siu (born 1943)
 Zhan Tao (born 1963)
 Zhang Jie (born 1937)
 Zhang Kangkang (born 1950)
 Zeng Jiongzhi (1898–1940)
 Zhong Xiaoyang (born 1962)
 Zhou Weihui (born 1973)
 Zhou Weiliang (1911–1995)
 Zhou Zuoren (1885–1967)
 Zhu Qianzhi (1899–1972)
 Zhu Ziqing (1898–1948)
 Zhu Xiao Di (born 1958)
 Zhu Xueqin (born 1952)
 Zong Pu (born 1928)

Alphabetical list

A
Ah Cheng (born 1949)
Ai Qing (1910–1996)
Anni Baobei (born 1974)
Anthony (1984–)

B
Ba Jin (1904-2005)
Bai Juyi (772–846)
Bai Renfu (1226–1306) 
Bai Shouyi (1909–2000)
Ban Biao (3–54)
Ban Gu (32–92)
Ban Zhao (fl. 1st century)
Bianji (fl. 7th century)
Bada Shanren (c. 1626 – 1705)
Bei Dao (born 1949)
Bi Feiyu (born 1964)
Bianji (fl. 7th century)
Bo Yang (1920–2008)

C
Cao Cao (155–220) 
Cao Pi (187–226) 
Cao Xueqin (1724–1764)
Cao Yu (1910–1996)
Cao Zhi (192–232)
Cai Yan (fl. 2nd century)
Cai Yong (132–192)
Cai Xiang (1012–1067)
Chang Hsüeh-ch'eng (1738–1801)
Eileen Chang (1920–1995)
Iris Chang (1968–2004) American Chinese author of The Rape of Nanking
Jung Chang (born 1952) author of Wild Swans
Leung Long Chau (1911–1998)
Chen Dayu (1912–2001)
Chang Hsin-hai (1898–1972)
Chen Hongmou (1696–1771)
Chen Maiping (born 1952)
Chen Qiufan (born 1981)
Chen Ran (born 1962)
Chen Shou (233–297)
Chen Zi'ang (661–702)
Cheng Yi (1033–1107)
Chi Li (born 1957)
Chi Zijian (born 1964)
Chu Anping (1909–1966)
Chu Suiliang (597–658)
Cui Hao (704–754)

D
Dai Xi (1801–1860)
Dai Zhen (1724–1777)
Dai Wangshu (1905–1950)
Di An (b. 1983)
Ding Ling (1904–1986)
Du Fu (712–770)
Du Guangting (850–933)
Du Mu (803–852) 
Du You (735–812)
Du Huan (fl. 8th century)
Duan Chengshi (d. 863)
Duanmu Hongliang (1912–1996)
Dong Xi (born 1966)
Dong Zhongshu (179–104 BC)
Dong Qichang (1555–1636)

E
Eileen Chang (1920–1995)
Eric Liu (born 1968)

F
Feng Menglong (1574–1645)
Feng Youlan (1895–1990)
Feng Jicai (born 1942)
Fan Chengda (1126–1193)
Fan Chung (born 1949)
Fan Ye (398–445)
Fang Fang (born 1955)
Fang Xuanling (579–648)
Fenggan (fl. 8th century)
Fu Baoshi (1904–1965)
Fu Shanxiang (1830–1864)
Feng Yidai (1913–2005)

G
Gan De (fl. 4th century BC)
Gang Tian (born 1958)
Gao Xingjian (born 1940)
Gao Lian (fl. 16th century)
Ge Fei (born 1964)
Ge Hong (284–364) 
Gongsun Long (c. 325–250 BC)
Gu Cheng (1956–1993)
Gu Hua (born 1942)
Gu Jiegang (1893–1980)
Guan Hanqing (1241–1320)
Guo Jingming (born 1983)
Guo Moruo (1892–1978)
Guo Pu (276–324)
Guo Shoujing (1231–1316)

H
Han Dong (born 1961)
Han Fei (c. 280–233 BC)
Han Han (born 1982)
Hanshan (fl. 9th century) 
Han Shaogong (born 1953)
Han Suyin (1917–2012)
Han Yu (768–824)
Hao Jingfang (born 1984)
He Changling (1785–1848)
He Qinglian (born 1956)
He Zhizhang (659–744)
Ho Fuk Yan
Hong Ying (born 1962)
Hong Liangji (1746–1809)
Hong Zicheng (1593–1665)
Ganggang Hu Guidice (born 1984)
Hu Sanxing (1230–1302)
Hu Shih (1891–1962)
Huaisu (737–799)
Huang Zongxi (1610–1695)
Huang Tingjian (1045–1105)
Huang Yuanyong (1885–1915)
Huang Zunxian (1848–1905)
Huang Ruheng (1558–1626)

I

J
Jao Tsung-I (1917–2018)
Ji Xianlin (1911–2009)
Ji Yun (1724–1805)
Jia Dao (779–843)
Jia Pingwa (born 1952)
Jia Rongqing
Jia Yinghua (born 1952)
Jiang Fangzhou (born 1989)
Jiang Rong (born 1946)
Jiang Tingxi (1669–1732)
Jiao Yu (fl. 14th century)
Jin Shengtan (1608–1661)
Jin Yuelin (1895–1984)
Jin Yong (1924–2018)
Jing Fang (78–37 BC)
Jung Chang (born 1952)

K
 Kang Youwei (1858–1927)
 Ke Yan (1929–2011)
 Ke Zhao (1910–2002)
 Maxine Hong Kingston (born 1940)

L
Lao She (1899–1966)
Li Ao (1935–2018)
Li Ao (772–841)
Li Bai (701–762)
Li Baiyao (564–647)
Li Baojia (1867–1906)
C. C. Li (1911–2003)
Li Chunfeng (602–670)
Li Delin (531–591)
Li Dashi (570–628)
Li Fang (925–996) 
Li He (790–816)
Li Jing (571–649)
Li Kui (fl. 4th century BC)
Li Qiao (644–713)
Li Qingzhao (1084–1151) 
Li Rui (born 1949)
Li Shangyin (813–858)
Li Shicen (1892–1934)
Li Shizhi (d. 747)
Li Shizhen (1518–1593)
Li Yu (1610–1680)
Li Yaotang (1904–2005)
Li Yu (937–978)
Zhenyu Li (born 1981)
Li Zhi (1527–1602)
Li Shanlan (1810–1882)
Liang Qichao (1873–1929)
Liang Shuming (1893–1988)
Liao Yiwu (born 1958)
Lin Haiyin (1918–2001)
Lin Huiyin (1904–1955) 
Lin Shu (1852–1924)
Lin Yutang (1895–1976)
Ling Li (1942–2018)
Ling Mengchu (1580–1644)
Liu Cixin (born 1963)
Liu E (1857–1909)
Liu Gongquan (778–865)
Liu Heng (born 1954)
Liu Hui (fl. 3rd century)
Liu Bowen (1311–1375)
Liu Tong (c. 1593 – 1636)
Liu Xiang (77–6 BC)
Liu Xiaobo (1955–2017)
Liu Xie (465–522) 
Liu Xin (d. 23)
Liu Xinwu (born 1942)
Liu Xinglong (born 1956)
Liu Yong (987–1053)
Liu Yong (born 1949)
Liu Yuxi (772–842)
Liu Zhenyun (born 1958)
Liu Zhi (fl. 8th century)
Liu Zhiji (661–721)
Liu Zongyuan (773–819)
Lu Guimeng (d. 881)
Lu Haodong (1868–1895)
Lu Ji (261–303)
Lu Tong (790–835)
Lu Xun (1881–1936) 
Lu You (1125–1210)
Lu Zhi (c. 1243 – 1315)
Luo Binwang (c. 640–684)
Luo Guanzhong (1330–1400)
Luo Yin (833–909)

M
 Ma Duanlin (1245–1322)
 Ma Jian (born 1953)
 Ma Rong (79–166)
 Ma Zhiyuan (c. 1270 – 1330)
 Mao Dun (1896–1981)
 Meng Haoran (691–740)
 Mengzi (c. 372–289 BC)
 Mi Fu (1051–1107)
 Mian Mian (born 1970)
 Mozi (fl. 5th century BC)
 Timothy Mo (born 1950)
 Mo Xuanqing (d. 834)
 Mo Yan (born 1955)
 Mou Zongsan (1909–1995)
 Mu Shiying (1912–1940)
 Murong Xuecun (born 1974)

O
 Öser (born 1966)
 Ouyang Xiu (1007–1072) 
 Ouyang Xun (557–641)

P
 Pai Hsien-yung (born 1937)
 Pu Songling (1640–1715)
 Pi Rixiu (c. 834–883)

Q
 Qian Xuantong (1887–1939)
 Qian Zhongshu (1910–1998)
 Qiao Ji (died 1345)
 Qin Hui (born 1953)
 Qin Jiushao (c. 1202 – 1261)
 Qu Bo (1923–2002)
 Qu Yuan (c. 340 BC–278 BC)
 Qu You (1341–1427)

R
 Ru Zhijuan (1925–1998)

S
Sha Menghai (1900–1992)
Shang Yang (d. 338 BC)
Shao Yong (1011–1077)
Shen Buhai (d. 337 BC)
Shen Congwen (1902–1988)
Shen Dao (c. 395–315 BC)
Shen Quanqi (c. 650-729)
Shen Rong (born 1936)
Shen Shixi (born 1952)
Shen Yin-mo (1883–1971) poet and calligrapher
Shen Yue (441–513)
Shen Zhou (1427–1509)
Shi Naian (c. 1296 – 1372)
Shi Kefa (1601–1645)
Shi Shen (fl. 4th century BC)
Shi Zhecun (1905–2003)
Shide (fl. 9th century) 
Shiing-Shen Chern (1911–2004)
Shing-Tung Yau (born 1949) 
Sima Guang (1019–1086)
Sima Qian (145 BC–90 BC)
Sima Xiangru (179–117 BC)
Sima Zhen (fl. 8th century)
Yum-Tong Siu (born 1943)
Song Yingxing (1587–1666)
Song Ci (1186–1249)
Song Yu (fl. 3rd century BC)
Song Zhiwen (660-712)
Su Buqing (1902–2003)
Su Hui (fl. 4th century)
Su Manshu (1884–1918)
Su Qing (1914–1982)
Su Shi (1037–1101)
Su Tong (born 1963)
Su Xiaoxiao (fl. 4th century)
Sunzi (fl. 6th century BC)
Sunzi (fl. 3rd century)
Sun Bin (d. 316 BC)
Sun Simiao (581–682)
Sun Guoting (646–691)
Sun Guangyuan (1900–1979)

T
 Amy Tan (born 1952)
 Tan Sitong (1865–1898)
 Tang Xianzu (1550–1616)
 Tang Junyi (1909–1978)
 Tang Zhen (1630–1704)
 Tao Yuanming (365–427)
 Tian Han (1898–1968)
 Tie Ning (born 1957)

W
Wang Anshi (1021–1086)
Wang Anyi (born 1954)
Wang Bi (226–249)
Wang Bo (c. 649–676)
Wang Changling (698–765)
Wang Chong (27–97)
Wang Chongyang (1113–1170)
Wang Fanzhi (fl. 7th century)
Wang Fuzhi (1619–1692)
Wang Guowei (1877–1927)
Wang Hao (1921–1995)
Wang Huo (born 1924)
Wang Lixiong (born 1953)
Wang Ruoshui (1926–2002)
Wang Shifu (fl. 14th century)
Wang Shuo (born 1958)
Wang Wei (701–761)
Wang Xizhi (303–361)
Wang Xianzhi (344–386)
Wang Xiaobo (1952–1997)
Wang Yangming (1472–1529)
Wang Zhen (fl. 14th century)
Wang Zhen (1867–1938)
Wei Zhuang (836–910)
Wei Shuo (272–349)
Wei Shou (506–572)
Wei Zheng (580–643)
Wei Boyang (fl. 2nd century)
Wei Huacun (252–334)
Wei Hui (born 1973)
Wei Yuan (1794–1856)
Wen Tianxiang (1236–1283)
Wen Zhenheng (1585–1645)
Wen Zhengming (1470–1559)
Wen Yiduo (1899–1946)
Woo Tsin-hang (1865–1953)
Wu Cheng'en (c. 1500 – 1582)
Wu Jiaji (1618–1684)
Wu Jingzi (1701–1754)
Wu Wenjun (1919–2017)
Wu Qi (d. 381 BC)
Wuzhun Shifan (1178–1249)

X
Xi Kang (223–262) 
Xiao Hong (1911–1942)
Xiao Jun (1907–1988)
Xie Daoyun (fl. 4th century)
Xie Lingyun (385–433)
Xie He (fl. 5th century)
Xin Qiji (1140–1207)
Xiong Shili (1885–1968)
Xiong Qinglai (1893–1969)
Xu Youyu (born 1947)
Xu Dishan (1893–1941) 
Xu Zhimo (1897–1931)
Xu Xiake (1587–1641)
Xue Zongzheng (born 1935)
Xue Juzheng (912–981)
Xue Tao (768–831)
Xu Zaisi (fl. 14th century)
Xu Guangqi (1562–1633)
Xu Wei (1521–1593)
Xu Yihua (1362–1407)
Xunzi (c. 310–238 BC)

Y
Yan Ge (born 1984)
Geling Yan (born 1958)
Yan Huiqing (1877–1950)
Yan Lianke (born 1958)
Yan Shigu (581–645)
Yan Zhenqing (709–785)
Yan Zhitui (531–591)
Yang Borun (1837–1911)
Yang Hui (c. 1238 – 1298) 
Yang Jianli (born 1963)
Yang Jiang (1911–2016)
Yang Rongguo (1907–1978)
Yang Shuo (1913–1968)
Yang Xiong (53 BC–18)
Ye Shengtao (1894–1988)
Ye Shi (1150–1223)
Yi Xing (683–727)
Yu Hao (fl. 10th century)
Yu Dafu (1896–1945)
Yu Hua (born 1960)
Yu Huan (fl. 3rd century)
Yu Shinan (558–638)
Yu Xuanji (844–869)
Yu Zhengxie (1775–1840)
Yuan Hongdao (1568–1610) 
Yuan Mei (1716–1797)
Yuan Zhen (779–831)

Z
Zeng Jiongzhi (1898–1940)
Zeng Gong (1019–1083)
Zengzi (505–436 BC)
Zhan Ruoshui (1466–1560)
Zhan Tao (born 1963)
Zhang Binglin (1868–1936)
Zhang Chengzhi (born 1948)
Zhang Henshui (1895–1967)
Zhang Heng (78–139)
Zhang Jie (born 1937)
Zhang Ji (fl. 8th century)
Zhang Kangkang (born 1950)
Zhang Ling (born 1957)
Zhang Ping (born 1953)
Zhang Sixun (fl. 10th century)
Zhang Tingyu (1672–1755)
Zhang Wei (born 1955)
Zhang Xianliang (1936–2014)
Zhang Xu (fl. 8th century)
Zhang Yanyuan (fl. 9th century)
Zhang Yaotiao (fl. 9th century)
Zhang Zhi (fl. 2nd century)
Zhang Zai (1020–1077)
Zhao Jingshen (1902–1985)
Zhao Luanluan (fl. 13th century)
Zhao Mengfu (1254–1322)
Zhao Shuli (1906–1970)
Zheng Xuan (127–200)
Zheng Yuanjie (1955- ) fairy tales
Zhong Hui (225–264)
Zhong Xiaoyang (born 1962)
Zhong Yao (151–230)
Zhou Weihui (born 1973)
Zhu Qianzhi (1899–1972)
Zhu Shijie (fl. 13th century)
Zhu Xueqin (born 1952)
Zhu Xiao Di (born 1958)
Zhu Yu (fl. 12th century)
Zhu Ziqing (1898–1948) 
Zhuangzi (fl. 4th century BC)
Zisi (c. 481–402 BC)
Zhu Xi (1130–1200)
Zhou Dunyi (1017–1073)
Zhou Lianggong (1612–1672)
Zhou Shoujuan (1895-1968)
Zhou Weiliang (1911–1995)
Zhou Zuoren (1885–1967)
Zong Pu (born 1928)
Zu Chongzhi (429–500)
Zu Geng (fl. 5th century)

See also
 Lists of authors
 List of China-related topics
 List of Chinese women writers
 List of Taiwanese writers
 List of Tibetan writers

References

Lists of writers by nationality
Writers
-
Writers